The Hungarian Ice Hockey Federation (MJSZ) is the governing body of ice hockey in Hungary. The federation was founded under the leadership of György Pásztor in 1988, when it separated from the Hungarian Ice Sports Association. He felt that to improve ice hockey in Hungary, a stronger national league was needed, which required more youths, more arenas, and proper leadership.

Notable people
 György Pásztor, vice-president (1988 to 1994) and IIHF Hall of Fame inductee.
 Zoltán Kovács, vice-president (since 2017) and Paul Loicq Award recipient.

References

External links

Hungary at IIHF.com

Ice hockey in Hungary
Ice hockey governing bodies in Europe
Ice Hockey
International Ice Hockey Federation members
1927 establishments in Hungary
Sports organizations established in 1927